Apostolidis is a Greek surname. It is a patronymic surname which literally means "the son of Apostolos". It may refer to the following people:

Christos Apostolidis (born 1952), Greek footballer
Gavriil Apostolidis (born 1989), Greek footballer
Georgios Apostolidis (born 1984), Greek basketball player
Giannis Apostolidis (born 1988), Greek footballer
Koulis Apostolidis (born 1946), Greek footballer
Loukas Apostolidis (born 1980), Greek footballer
Manolis Apostolidis (born 1983), Greek football player
Renos Apostolidis (1924-2004), Greek writer, philologist and literary critic.

Greek-language surnames
Surnames
Patronymic surnames